Begbrook is a suburb of Bristol. It is named after the eponymous stream, which is a tributary of the Frome river.

References

Areas of Bristol